The 2002–03 Colorado Avalanche season was the Avalanche's eighth season. It involved winning their 5th Northwest Division and ninth consecutive division title.

Offseason

Regular season
Head coach Bob Hartley was fired on December 18 and replaced by assistant coach Tony Granato.
January 20, 2003: In a game against the Dallas Stars, Patrick Roy became the first goaltender to appear in 1,000 regular season games. At the end of the game, Marty Turco raised his mask to praise Patrick. Prior to the game, Rogatien Vachon presented Roy with a  silver goalie stick. Jim Gregory, vice-president of operations for the NHL presented Roy with a crystal sculpture.
April 6, 2003: In a game against the St. Louis Blues, Patrick Roy played the last regular season game of his career. The Avalanche won the game by a score of 5–2. It was Roy's 1,029th game, and his 551st victory.

Final standings

Playoffs

Schedule and results

Regular season

|- align="center" 
|1||T||October 9, 2002||1–1 OT|| align="left"|  Dallas Stars (2002–03) ||0–0–1–0 || 
|- align="center" bgcolor="#FFBBBB"
|2||L||October 14, 2002||1–2 || align="left"|  Boston Bruins (2002–03) ||0–1–1–0 || 
|- align="center" bgcolor="#CCFFCC" 
|3||W||October 17, 2002||4–1 || align="left"| @ Los Angeles Kings (2002–03) ||1–1–1–0 || 
|- align="center" bgcolor="#CCFFCC" 
|4||W||October 19, 2002||3–1 || align="left"| @ San Jose Sharks (2002–03) ||2–1–1–0 || 
|- align="center" bgcolor="#FF6F6F"
|5||OTL||October 20, 2002||2–3 OT|| align="left"| @ Mighty Ducks of Anaheim (2002–03) ||2–1–1–1 || 
|- align="center" 
|6||T||October 22, 2002||3–3 OT|| align="left"|  Edmonton Oilers (2002–03) ||2–1–2–1 || 
|- align="center" bgcolor="#CCFFCC" 
|7||W||October 24, 2002||3–2 || align="left"| @ Phoenix Coyotes (2002–03) ||3–1–2–1 || 
|- align="center" 
|8||T||October 27, 2002||3–3 OT|| align="left"|  Minnesota Wild (2002–03) ||3–1–3–1 || 
|- align="center" bgcolor="#FF6F6F"
|9||OTL||October 29, 2002||2–3 OT|| align="left"| @ Minnesota Wild (2002–03) ||3–1–3–2 || 
|- align="center" bgcolor="#CCFFCC" 
|10||W||October 31, 2002||5–1 || align="left"| @ Vancouver Canucks (2002–03) ||4–1–3–2 || 
|-

|- align="center" 
|11||T||November 2, 2002||4–4 OT|| align="left"| @ Calgary Flames (2002–03) ||4–1–4–2 || 
|- align="center" bgcolor="#FFBBBB"
|12||L||November 4, 2002||2–4 || align="left"|  Vancouver Canucks (2002–03) ||4–2–4–2 || 
|- align="center" bgcolor="#FFBBBB"
|13||L||November 6, 2002||2–5 || align="left"|  Ottawa Senators (2002–03) ||4–3–4–2 || 
|- align="center" bgcolor="#FF6F6F"
|14||OTL||November 8, 2002||2–3 OT|| align="left"|  Mighty Ducks of Anaheim (2002–03) ||4–3–4–3 || 
|- align="center" bgcolor="#FFBBBB"
|15||L||November 10, 2002||3–4 || align="left"|  Nashville Predators (2002–03) ||4–4–4–3 || 
|- align="center" bgcolor="#CCFFCC" 
|16||W||November 12, 2002||5–4 || align="left"|  Columbus Blue Jackets (2002–03) ||5–4–4–3 || 
|- align="center" bgcolor="#CCFFCC" 
|17||W||November 14, 2002||3–1 || align="left"| @ Nashville Predators (2002–03) ||6–4–4–3 || 
|- align="center" bgcolor="#FFBBBB"
|18||L||November 15, 2002||2–4 || align="left"| @ Dallas Stars (2002–03) ||6–5–4–3 || 
|- align="center" 
|19||T||November 17, 2002||4–4 OT|| align="left"| @ Phoenix Coyotes (2002–03) ||6–5–5–3 || 
|- align="center" 
|20||T||November 21, 2002||1–1 OT|| align="left"|  Nashville Predators (2002–03) ||6–5–6–3 || 
|- align="center" bgcolor="#CCFFCC" 
|21||W||November 23, 2002||3–1 || align="left"| @ St. Louis Blues (2002–03) ||7–5–6–3 || 
|- align="center" bgcolor="#CCFFCC" 
|22||W||November 25, 2002||1–0 || align="left"|  Chicago Blackhawks (2002–03) ||8–5–6–3 || 
|- align="center" 
|23||T||November 27, 2002||4–4 OT|| align="left"|  St. Louis Blues (2002–03) ||8–5–7–3 || 
|- align="center" 
|24||T||November 29, 2002||2–2 OT|| align="left"| @ Minnesota Wild (2002–03) ||8–5–8–3 || 
|- align="center" bgcolor="#FFBBBB"
|25||L||November 30, 2002||0–1 || align="left"| @ Edmonton Oilers (2002–03) ||8–6–8–3 || 
|-

|- align="center" bgcolor="#FFBBBB"
|26||L||December 3, 2002||1–2 || align="left"|  Calgary Flames (2002–03) ||8–7–8–3 || 
|- align="center" bgcolor="#CCFFCC" 
|27||W||December 6, 2002||7–6 OT|| align="left"|  Montreal Canadiens (2002–03) ||9–7–8–3 || 
|- align="center" bgcolor="#FFBBBB"
|28||L||December 11, 2002||1–3 || align="left"| @ Vancouver Canucks (2002–03) ||9–8–8–3 || 
|- align="center" bgcolor="#FF6F6F"
|29||OTL||December 13, 2002||3–4 OT|| align="left"| @ Edmonton Oilers (2002–03) ||9–8–8–4 || 
|- align="center" bgcolor="#CCFFCC" 
|30||W||December 14, 2002||3–1 || align="left"| @ Calgary Flames (2002–03) ||10–8–8–4 || 
|- align="center" 
|31||T||December 16, 2002||2–2 OT|| align="left"|  Washington Capitals (2002–03) ||10–8–9–4 || 
|- align="center" bgcolor="#CCFFCC" 
|32||W||December 19, 2002||2–1 || align="left"|  Edmonton Oilers (2002–03) ||11–8–9–4 || 
|- align="center" bgcolor="#CCFFCC" 
|33||W||December 21, 2002||4–2 || align="left"|  Minnesota Wild (2002–03) ||12–8–9–4 || 
|- align="center" bgcolor="#CCFFCC" 
|34||W||December 23, 2002||5–3 || align="left"|  Vancouver Canucks (2002–03) ||13–8–9–4 || 
|- align="center" bgcolor="#FFBBBB"
|35||L||December 26, 2002||2–3 || align="left"| @ St. Louis Blues (2002–03) ||13–9–9–4 || 
|- align="center" bgcolor="#FF6F6F"
|36||OTL||December 27, 2002||1–2 OT|| align="left"|  Philadelphia Flyers (2002–03) ||13–9–9–5 || 
|- align="center" bgcolor="#CCFFCC" 
|37||W||December 29, 2002||6–1 || align="left"|  Los Angeles Kings (2002–03) ||14–9–9–5 || 
|-

|- align="center" bgcolor="#CCFFCC" 
|38||W||January 1, 2003||7–3 || align="left"| @ Nashville Predators (2002–03) ||15–9–9–5 || 
|- align="center" bgcolor="#FFBBBB"
|39||L||January 2, 2003||1–4 || align="left"|  Florida Panthers (2002–03) ||15–10–9–5 || 
|- align="center" bgcolor="#CCFFCC" 
|40||W||January 4, 2003||6–1 || align="left"| @ San Jose Sharks (2002–03) ||16–10–9–5 || 
|- align="center" bgcolor="#FFBBBB"
|41||L||January 7, 2003||2–4 || align="left"|  Calgary Flames (2002–03) ||16–11–9–5 || 
|- align="center" bgcolor="#FFBBBB"
|42||L||January 9, 2003||3–5 || align="left"|  Mighty Ducks of Anaheim (2002–03) ||16–12–9–5 || 
|- align="center" bgcolor="#FFBBBB"
|43||L||January 11, 2003||3–6 || align="left"| @ Dallas Stars (2002–03) ||16–13–9–5 || 
|- align="center" bgcolor="#CCFFCC" 
|44||W||January 12, 2003||3–2 OT|| align="left"| @ Carolina Hurricanes (2002–03) ||17–13–9–5 || 
|- align="center" bgcolor="#FFBBBB"
|45||L||January 16, 2003||2–4 || align="left"|  Detroit Red Wings (2002–03) ||17–14–9–5 || 
|- align="center" 
|46||T||January 20, 2003||1–1 OT|| align="left"|  Dallas Stars (2002–03) ||17–14–10–5 || 
|- align="center" bgcolor="#CCFFCC" 
|47||W||January 23, 2003||5–0 || align="left"|  Columbus Blue Jackets (2002–03) ||18–14–10–5 || 
|- align="center" bgcolor="#CCFFCC" 
|48||W||January 25, 2003||3–0 || align="left"| @ Toronto Maple Leafs (2002–03) ||19–14–10–5 || 
|- align="center" 
|49||T||January 28, 2003||2–2 OT|| align="left"| @ Columbus Blue Jackets (2002–03) ||19–14–11–5 || 
|- align="center" bgcolor="#CCFFCC" 
|50||W||January 30, 2003||4–3 OT|| align="left"| @ New York Rangers (2002–03) ||20–14–11–5 || 
|-

|- align="center" bgcolor="#CCFFCC" 
|51||W||February 4, 2003||3–2 OT|| align="left"| @ Boston Bruins (2002–03) ||21–14–11–5 || 
|- align="center" bgcolor="#CCFFCC" 
|52||W||February 6, 2003||1–0 || align="left"| @ Detroit Red Wings (2002–03) ||22–14–11–5 || 
|- align="center" bgcolor="#CCFFCC" 
|53||W||February 8, 2003||5–3 || align="left"|  Detroit Red Wings (2002–03) ||23–14–11–5 || 
|- align="center" bgcolor="#CCFFCC" 
|54||W||February 9, 2003||4–2 || align="left"|  Calgary Flames (2002–03) ||24–14–11–5 || 
|- align="center" bgcolor="#CCFFCC" 
|55||W||February 11, 2003||3–1 || align="left"|  New Jersey Devils (2002–03) ||25–14–11–5 || 
|- align="center" bgcolor="#FF6F6F"
|56||OTL||February 13, 2003||1–2 OT|| align="left"| @ Vancouver Canucks (2002–03) ||25–14–11–6 || 
|- align="center" bgcolor="#CCFFCC" 
|57||W||February 15, 2003||3–2 || align="left"|  Minnesota Wild (2002–03) ||26–14–11–6 || 
|- align="center" bgcolor="#CCFFCC" 
|58||W||February 17, 2003||5–4 || align="left"| @ Chicago Blackhawks (2002–03) ||27–14–11–6 || 
|- align="center" bgcolor="#CCFFCC" 
|59||W||February 20, 2003||5–2 || align="left"| @ Pittsburgh Penguins (2002–03) ||28–14–11–6 || 
|- align="center" bgcolor="#FFBBBB"
|60||L||February 21, 2003||1–4 || align="left"| @ New York Islanders (2002–03) ||28–15–11–6 || 
|- align="center" bgcolor="#CCFFCC" 
|61||W||February 23, 2003||4–1 || align="left"|  New York Rangers (2002–03) ||29–15–11–6 || 
|- align="center" bgcolor="#CCFFCC" 
|62||W||February 25, 2003||4–2 || align="left"|  Edmonton Oilers (2002–03) ||30–15–11–6 || 
|- align="center" bgcolor="#FF6F6F"
|63||OTL||February 27, 2003||3–4 OT|| align="left"|  Atlanta Thrashers (2002–03) ||30–15–11–7 || 
|-

|- align="center" bgcolor="#CCFFCC" 
|64||W||March 1, 2003||4–1 || align="left"|  Pittsburgh Penguins (2002–03) ||31–15–11–7 || 
|- align="center" bgcolor="#CCFFCC" 
|65||W||March 2, 2003||3–2 OT|| align="left"| @ Chicago Blackhawks (2002–03) ||32–15–11–7 || 
|- align="center" bgcolor="#CCFFCC" 
|66||W||March 5, 2003||3–1 || align="left"| @ Florida Panthers (2002–03) ||33–15–11–7 || 
|- align="center" bgcolor="#FFBBBB"
|67||L||March 7, 2003||3–4 || align="left"| @ Tampa Bay Lightning (2002–03) ||33–16–11–7 || 
|- align="center" bgcolor="#CCFFCC" 
|68||W||March 8, 2003||2–1 OT|| align="left"| @ Philadelphia Flyers (2002–03) ||34–16–11–7 || 
|- align="center" 
|69||T||March 10, 2003||2–2 OT|| align="left"|  Phoenix Coyotes (2002–03) ||34–16–12–7 || 
|- align="center" bgcolor="#CCFFCC" 
|70||W||March 13, 2003||5–1 || align="left"| @ Columbus Blue Jackets (2002–03) ||35–16–12–7 || 
|- align="center" bgcolor="#FFBBBB"
|71||L||March 15, 2003||3–5 || align="left"| @ Detroit Red Wings (2002–03) ||35–17–12–7 || 
|- align="center" bgcolor="#FFBBBB"
|72||L||March 16, 2003||1–2 || align="left"| @ Washington Capitals (2002–03) ||35–18–12–7 || 
|- align="center" bgcolor="#CCFFCC" 
|73||W||March 20, 2003||2–0 || align="left"|  San Jose Sharks (2002–03) ||36–18–12–7 || 
|- align="center" bgcolor="#CCFFCC" 
|74||W||March 22, 2003||8–1 || align="left"|  Chicago Blackhawks (2002–03) ||37–18–12–7 || 
|- align="center" bgcolor="#FF6F6F"
|75||OTL||March 24, 2003||3–4 OT|| align="left"| @ Buffalo Sabres (2002–03) ||37–18–12–8 || 
|- align="center" 
|76||T||March 25, 2003||2–2 OT|| align="left"| @ Ottawa Senators (2002–03) ||37–18–13–8 || 
|- align="center" bgcolor="#CCFFCC" 
|77||W||March 27, 2003||3–0 || align="left"|  Los Angeles Kings (2002–03) ||38–18–13–8 || 
|- align="center" bgcolor="#CCFFCC" 
|78||W||March 29, 2003||6–1 || align="left"|  Phoenix Coyotes (2002–03) ||39–18–13–8 || 
|- align="center" bgcolor="#CCFFCC" 
|79||W||March 31, 2003||3–1 || align="left"|  San Jose Sharks (2002–03) ||40–18–13–8 || 
|-

|- align="center" bgcolor="#FFBBBB"
|80||L||April 2, 2003||3–5 || align="left"| @ Los Angeles Kings (2002–03) ||40–19–13–8 || 
|- align="center" bgcolor="#CCFFCC" 
|81||W||April 4, 2003||4–3 OT|| align="left"| @ Mighty Ducks of Anaheim (2002–03) ||41–19–13–8 || 
|- align="center" bgcolor="#CCFFCC" 
|82||W||April 6, 2003||5–2 || align="left"|  St. Louis Blues (2002–03) ||42–19–13–8 || 
|-

|-
| Legend:

Playoffs

|- align="center" bgcolor="#FFBBBB" 
|1||L||April 10, 2003||2–4 || align="left"| Minnesota Wild || Wild lead 1–0 || 
|- align="center" bgcolor="#CCFFCC" 
|2||W||April 12, 2003||3–2 || align="left"| Minnesota Wild || Series tied 1–1 || 
|- align="center" bgcolor="#CCFFCC" 
|3||W||April 14, 2003||3–0 || align="left"| @ Minnesota Wild || Avalanche lead 2–1 || 
|- align="center" bgcolor="#CCFFCC" 
|4||W||April 16, 2003||3–1 || align="left"| @ Minnesota Wild || Avalanche lead 3–1 || 
|- align="center" bgcolor="#FFBBBB" 
|5||L||April 19, 2003||2–3 || align="left"| Minnesota Wild || Avalanche lead 3–2 || 
|- align="center" bgcolor="#FFBBBB" 
|6||L||April 21, 2003||2–3 OT || align="left"| @ Minnesota Wild || Series tied 3–3 || 
|- align="center" bgcolor="#FFBBBB" 
|7||L||April 22, 2003||2–3 OT || align="left"| Minnesota Wild || Wild win 4–3 || 
|-

|-
| Legend:

Player statistics

Scoring
 Position abbreviations: C = Center; D = Defense; G = Goaltender; LW = Left Wing; RW = Right Wing
  = Joined team via a transaction (e.g., trade, waivers, signing) during the season. Stats reflect time with the Avalanche only.
  = Left team via a transaction (e.g., trade, waivers, release) during the season. Stats reflect time with the Avalanche only.

Goaltending

Awards and records

Awards

Milestones

Transactions
The Avalanche were involved in the following transactions from June 14, 2002, the day after the deciding game of the 2002 Stanley Cup Finals, through June 9, 2003, the day of the deciding game of the 2003 Stanley Cup Finals.

Trades

Players acquired

Players lost

Signings

Draft picks
Colorado's draft picks at the 2002 NHL Entry Draft held at the Air Canada Centre in Toronto, Ontario.

See also
2002–03 NHL season

Notes

References

Colorado
Colorado
Colorado Avalanche seasons
Colorado Avalanche
Colorado Avalanche